Kotwa Airport  is a military airport in Kotwa, Mashonaland East province, Zimbabwe.

See also
Transport in Zimbabwe
List of airports in Zimbabwe

References

External links
Kotwa Airport
OpenStreetMap - Kotwa
OurAirports - Kotwa

Zimbabwean airbases
Airports in Zimbabwe